The 2013 Amstel Gold Race was the 48th running of the Amstel Gold Race, a single-day cycling race.

Teams
As the Amstel Gold Race is a UCI World Tour event, all 19 UCI ProTeams were automatically invited and obligated to send a squad. Six other squads were given wildcard places into the race, and as such, formed the event's 25-team peloton.

The 19 UCI ProTeams that competed in the race:

The 6 teams who were given wild cards:

Race overview

Results

References

External links

Amstel Gold Race
2013 UCI World Tour
2013 in Dutch sport